The Miss Nicaragua 2007 pageant, was held on March 17, 2007 in Managua, after weeks of events.  At the conclusion of the final night of competition, the winner will represent Nicaragua at Miss Universe 2007.  The rest of the finalists would enter in different pageants.

Placements

.

Official Contestants

Judges

 Peter Bernal - Journalist of Miami Herald Newspaper
 Luzmila Kojevnikova - Fashion Designer
 Columba Calvo - Mexican  Ambassador in Nicaragua
 Oscar Romero - Fashion Stylist
 Aida Lopez -  Representative of AFN (American Nicaraguan Foundation)
 Jannet D'Sandoval -  Owner of G&B BOUTIQUE
 Ana Cecilia Arguello -  Operations Manager of BANPRO S.A
 William Garcia -  Creative Director of JVT Advisors S.A
 Emilia Vargas - Professional Event Coordinatior

.

Background Music

Opening Show – La Nueva Compania - "Viva Leon, Jodido"
Swimsuit Competition - The Pussycat Dolls - "I Don't Need A Man"
Evening Gown Competition – Vitas - "La Donna E Mobile"

.

Special Guests

 Frank Torres - "Juventud, Divino Tesoro"
 Zona 21 - "Donde Estas"

.

References

Miss Nicaragua
2007 in Nicaragua
2007 beauty pageants